Ruben Bemelmans was the defending champion but withdrew as he qualified for the 2018 Australian Open.

Mats Moraing won the title after defeating Kenny de Schepper 6–2, 6–1 in the final.

Seeds

Draw

Finals

Top half

Bottom half

References
Main Draw
Qualifying Draw

Koblenz Open - Singles
2018 Singles